Eulepte concordalis is a moth in the family Crambidae. It was described by Jacob Hübner in 1825. It is found in Brazil, Suriname, Panama, Costa Rica and Mexico.

References

Moths described in 1825
Spilomelinae
Moths of Central America
Moths of South America